South or  also known by other names, is a lake northeast of Golmud in Dulan County, Haixi Prefecture, Qinghai Province, China. A part of the Qarhan Playa, it lies east of Tuanjie Lake and south of North Hulsan Lake. Like the other lakes of the surrounding Qaidam Basin, it is extremely saline.

Name
Hulsan or Hollusun Nor is a romanization of a Mongolian name meaning "Reed Lake", from their former abundance in the area. The adjective "south" distinguishes it from nearby North Hulsan Lake. Huoluxun and Huobuxun are the pinyin romanizations of the Mandarin pronunciation of the same name's transcriptions into Chinese characters. Nan Hulsan or Nanhuobuxun is the same name, prefixed with the Chinese word for "South".

Geography
It lies east of Tuanjie Lake and south of North Hulsan Lake. It is fed from the east by the Nuomuhong   Nuòmùhóng Hé) and Sulinggele or Suolinguole River.

It usually increases from the winter and spring floods and decreases during the summer and autumn. In the especially dry year of 2000, it was only . An inflow from the north by mineral springs in the playa's northern karst zone contribute a smaller volume of water but its much higher solute concentration greatly affects the lake and its sediments.

History

South Hulsan Lake has gained somewhat since the year 2000 as North Hulsan has shrunk in size to ephemeral status; this is thought to be related to the many salt pans constructed in recent years to harvest the lakes' sediment for potash.

Gallery

See also
 Qarhan Playa and Qaidam Basin
 List of lakes and saltwater lakes of China

Notes

References

Citations

Bibliography
 .
 .
 .
 .
 .
 .
 .
 .
 .
 .

Lakes of China
Lakes of Qinghai
Haixi Mongol and Tibetan Autonomous Prefecture